Francis John Taylor (13 November 1912 – 4 July 1971) was the third Bishop of Sheffield from  1962. Born on 13 November 1912 and educated at Hymers College and The Queen's College, Oxford, he was ordained in 1937 and began his career with  a curacy at Walcot, Bath.  He was then a Tutor, Lecturer and Chaplain at Wycliffe Hall, Oxford after which he was Vicar of Christ Church, Claughton, Merseyside. From 1954, he was Principal of  Wycliffe, a post he held until his elevation to the Episcopate . He died in post on 4 July 1971 aged 58.

Notes

1912 births

1971 deaths

People from Kingston upon Hull

People educated at Hymers College
Alumni of The Queen's College, Oxford
Principals of Wycliffe Hall, Oxford
20th-century Church of England bishops
Bishops of Sheffield
20th-century English Anglican priests